The 1967 Ohio Bobcats football team was an American football team that represented Ohio University in the Mid-American Conference (MAC) during the 1967 NCAA University Division football season. In their tenth season under head coach Bill Hess, the Bobcats tied for the MAC championship, compiled a 6–4 record (5–1 against MAC opponents), and outscored all opponents by a combined total of 210 to 152.  They played their home games in Peden Stadium in Athens, Ohio.

The team's statistical leaders included Dick Conley with 841 rushing yards, Cleve Bryant with 1,157 passing yards, and Todd Snyder with 629 receiving yards.

Schedule

References

Ohio
Ohio Bobcats football seasons
Mid-American Conference football champion seasons
Ohio Bobcats football